Beyler is a village and municipality in the Saatly District of Azerbaijan. It has a population of 1,495.

References

Populated places in Saatly District